Duje Bonačić (10 April 1929 – 24 January 2020) was a Croatian rower who won a gold medal representing Yugoslavia in the coxless four event at the 1952 Summer Olympics.

Bonačić was born in Split to a Croatian father and Slovenian mother. He had an elder brother Vojko and a sister Nevenka. He graduated in natural sciences in Zagreb, and took up rowing to build muscles, as he weighed only 56 kg with a height of 183 cm at the time. After retiring from competitions he worked as a professor of geography, meteorology and oceanography at maritime schools and also served as a coach and referee in rowing and sailing.

After the death of Željko Čajkovski on 11 November 2016, he became the oldest Croatian Olympic medal winner. Bonačić died on January 24, 2020, at the age of 90 following a short illness.

References

External links
 
 
 
 
 

1929 births
2020 deaths
Croatian male rowers
Olympic rowers of Yugoslavia
Rowers at the 1952 Summer Olympics
Olympic gold medalists for Yugoslavia
Rowers from Split, Croatia
Olympic medalists in rowing
Croatian people of Slovenian descent
Medalists at the 1952 Summer Olympics
Burials at Lovrinac Cemetery